The Li Gang incident occurred on the evening of October 16, 2010, inside Hebei University in Baoding in Hebei province of China, when a black Volkswagen Magotan traveling down a narrow lane hit two university students. One of them, 20-year-old Chen Xiaofeng, a student from Shijiazhuang at the Electronic Information Engineering College died later in the hospital. The other victim, Zhang Jingjing, aged 19, remained in a stable condition, albeit suffering from a fractured left leg.

The drunk driver, 22-year-old Li Qiming, tried to escape the scene and continued driving to the female dormitory to drop off his girlfriend. When arrested by security guards, convinced his father's position would give him immunity, he shouted out, "Go ahead, sue me if you dare. My dad is Li Gang!"

After outrage erupted on Chinese internet forums, a doxing search revealed that Li Gang was the deputy director of the local public security bureau. Four days after the incident, an online poetry contest invited entrants to incorporate the sentence "My father is Li Gang" (我爸是李刚, pinyin: Wǒ bà shì Lǐ Gāng) into classical Chinese poems.  The contest was created by a female blogger in northern China nicknamed Piggy Feet Beta on MOP, a popular Chinese bulletin board system. It received more than 6,000 submissions. The phrase has since become a popular catchphrase and internet meme within China, frequently seen on various forums and message boards, and in similar competitions using ad slogans and song lyrics, and used ironically in conversation by speakers trying to avoid responsibility.

Communist Party officials tried at first to suppress reports of the incident, but their efforts backfired. During an interview with China Central Television on 21 October, Li Gang wept in an apology; then on 22 October, a video showing Li Qiming's apology was released. The apology was rejected by the victims' families, including Chen’s elder brother who believed the apology to be a political stunt. The People's Daily, in an editorial published on October 26, urged authorities to take the affair into their own hands and shed light on the matter.

On October 29, the South China Morning Post and other sources revealed that a directive from the Central Propaganda Department, issued on October 28, required that there be "no more hype regarding the disturbance over traffic at Hebei University," and ordered Chinese newspapers to recall their reporters from Baoding.

On November 1, Zhang Kai, the attorney for the relatives of Chen Xiaofeng, was abruptly asked to terminate his representation in the case, after the law firm was cautioned by the Beijing Bureau of Justice, according to a blog by Wang Keqin, an influential Chinese muckraking reporter, 
blogger and professor at Peking University. That same day, Director Liu of Baoding Traffic Police Division and some clerks from Wangdu County proposed payments to the relatives of Chen Xiaofeng to settle the case.

On November 4, the Central Propaganda Department banned news of an interview by Phoenix Television with Chen Xiaofeng’s brother, Chen Lin, in which he was critical of the government.

On November 9, Internet discussion of the case had ceased due to regulations, but local students and activists such as Ai Weiwei have continued to speak out.

On January 2011, Li Qiming was arrested. He was sentenced to six years in jail and ordered to pay the equivalent of $69,900 in compensation to the family of Chen Xiaofeng. Li was also ordered to pay $13,800 to the injured woman.

Timeline 
 October 16, 2010, around 21:40: Hebei Institute of Media student Li Qiming drove drunk and hit two female students, Chen Xiaofeng and Zhang Jingjing, after picking up his girlfriend. After the accident Li shouted "My father is Li Gang!”, referring to his father's status and influence as the deputy director of Baoding public security bureau, Hebei province. 
 October 17, in the evening: Chen Xiaofeng dies in the hospital. The other student, Zhang Jingjing, received only a minor injury and was kept in the hospital. 
 October 18: Rumors begin to spread that the Hebei Institute of Media was telling students who witnessed the accident to stop discussing the accident and discouraged further discussion of the topic in general. 
 October 22: Li Qiming and his father Li Gang broadcast a tearful apology on CCTV (China Central Television) to the victims.  
 October 26: The governor of the Hebei province announced that the drunk-driving accident will be processed as a serious legal offence.
 November 5: Chen's family and Li's family settled out of court for a compensation of 460,000 yuan.  
 November 7: Chen Xiaofeng was buried.
 December 14: Chen's lawyer, Zhang Kai, was beaten in the street. He posted on his blog that he thought that there might be some connection between the government and the gangster that was involved. 
 December 21: The Baoding public security bureau announced that this accident counted as a criminal case, which made it impossible to settle out of court. Suspect Li Qiming was still imprisoned.  
 January 26, 2011: Wangdu county, Hebei people's court opened its court session of the accident. Li was charged with committing the crime of causing traffic casualties. Chen's family was there in the audience. 
 January 30: The court sentenced Li Qiming to jail for 6 years  and ordered him to pay both victims some restitution.

See also
 Hefei student protests
 Chinese Internet slang
 Grass Mud Horse
 Great Firewall
 Internet Water Army
 Censorship in China
 Corruption in China
 Crime in China
 Internet in China
 Internet censorship in China
 Law enforcement in China
 List of Internet phenomena in China

References

Society of China
2010 crimes in China
October 2010 crimes
Crime in China
Scandals in China
Internet memes
Baoding